Powerlifting at the 1988 Summer Paralympics consisted of nine events.

Medal summary

References 

 

 
1988 Summer Paralympics events
Paralympics